The 2014 San Francisco Board of Supervisors elections occurred on November 4, 2014. Five of the eleven seats of the San Francisco Board of Supervisors were contested in this election. Incumbents in all five districts successfully ran for re-election.

Municipal elections in California are officially non-partisan, though most candidates in San Francisco do receive funding and support from various political parties. The election was held using ranked-choice voting.

Results

District 2 

This district consists of the Marina, Cow Hollow, Pacific Heights, Seacliff, Lake District, Presidio Heights, Jordan Park, Laurel Heights, Presidio, and part of Russian Hill. Supervisor Mark Farrell successfully won re-election.

District 4 

District 4 consists of the Central Sunset, Outer Sunset, Parkside, Outer Parkside, and Pine Lake Park. Supervisor Katy Tang won re-election to the Board of Supervisors after first being appointed to the Board in 2013.

District 6 

District 6 consists of the Union Square, Tenderloin, Civic Center, Mid-Market, Cathedral Hill, South of Market, South Beach, and  Mission Bay.

District 8 

District 8 consists of The Castro, Noe Valley, Diamond Heights, Glen Park, Corona Heights, Eureka Valley, Dolores Heights, Mission Dolores, Duboce Triangle, Buena Vista Park, and part of Twin Peaks.

District 10 

District 10 consists of Potrero Hill, Central Waterfront, Dogpatch, Bayview-Hunters Point, Bayview Heights, India Basin, Silver Terrace, Candlestick Point, Visitacion Valley, Little Hollywood, Sunnydale, and McLaren Park.

References

External links 
City and County of San Francisco Department of Elections

San Francisco Board of Supervisors
San Francisco Board of Supervisors
Board of Supervisors 2014